Keenan MacWilliam (born 26 December 1989) is a Canadian actress, singer, dancer, writer, director, fashion designer, producer, art director, graphic designer, and associate producer. She is best known for her roles as Carole Hanson #1 on "The Saddle Club" and Karen in "Get a Clue". Keenan started singing and took guitar lessons when she was six years old, and began taking singing lessons when she was seven years old, singing in The Ottawa Children's Choir for two years.

The Saddle Club
In 2000, MacWilliam was cast as Carole Hanson #1 in The Saddle Club, a television series based on a series of books written by Bonnie Bryant. During the show's sporadic run, MacWilliam released several albums with her series co-stars which all have charted in Australia, two of which earned Gold status.

MacWilliam and other cast members performed The Saddle Club Arena Show on horseback during the Sydney Royal Easter Show in 2004 at the Sydney SuperDome. MacWilliam is living in New York and working as an art director and associate producer.

Filmography

Discography

The Saddle Club albums 

Fun For Everyone (2002)
On Top of the World (2003)
Friends Forever (2003)
Secrets & Dreams (2004)
Hello World – The Best of the Saddle Club (2004)
Summer with the Saddle Club (2008)
The Saddle Club – Greatest Hits (2009)
Grand Gallop – Hello World (2009) Released in France only.

The Saddle Club Singles 
 "We Are the Saddle Club" (2002) – Australia
 "Hello World" (2002) – #27 Australia #8 France
 "Hey Hey What You Say" (2003) – #20 Australia
 "Hello World"/"Hey Hey What You Say" (2003)
 "Wonderland" (2003) – #17 Australia
 Special Mane Event EP (2004)
 "Undercover Movers and Shakers/Boogie Oogie Oogie" (2003) – #29 Australia
 "Everybody Come On" (2003)
 "L.I.F.E" (2004) – #34 Australia
 "Welcome to the Saddle Club" (2004)
 "Sleeping Under the Stars" (2004)

Keenan's Singles
 Perfect Boy
 Ride Like The Wind
 Mango

References

External links

1989 births
Actresses from Ottawa
Black Canadian actresses
Canadian child actresses
Canadian television actresses
Living people